Below is a list of office-holders:

External links 
Duma website

Lists of legislative speakers in Russia
Politics of Volgograd Oblast